Souleymane Diallo is a name. People with that name include:

Souleymane Diallo (boxer), French boxer
Souleymane Diallo (footballer), Mauritanian footballer

Human name disambiguation pages